Mal Artha Gading is a shopping mall located in Kelapa Gading, North Jakarta, Indonesia. The architecture was adopted from silk road and consists of types from seven wonders of the world.

See also

Indonesian architecture

External links
 Official Website

Artha Gading
North Jakarta